The Snæfellsnes is a peninsula situated to the west of Borgarfjörður, in western Iceland.

The Snæfellsjökull volcano, regarded as one of the symbols of Iceland, can be found in the area. With its height of 1446 m, it is the highest mountain on the peninsula and has a glacier at its peak (jökull means "glacier" in Icelandic). The volcano can be seen on clear days from Reykjavík, a distance of about 120 km. The mountain is also known as the setting of the novel Journey to the Center of the Earth by the French author Jules Verne. The area surrounding Snæfellsjökull has been designated one of the four National Parks by the government of Iceland. It is also the home of the Ingjaldsholl church, a Protestant church.

The peninsula is one of the main settings in the Laxdœla saga and it was, according to this saga, the birthplace of the first West Norse member of the Varangian Guard, Bolli Bollasson. Other historical people who lived in the area according to the saga include Guðrún Ósvífursdóttir, Bolli Þorleiksson and Snorri Goði.

Local fishing villages and small towns on the northern shore of Snæfellsnes include Arnarstapi, Hellnar, Rif , Ólafsvík, Grundarfjörður and Stykkishólmur.

Near Hellissandur is the tallest structure in western Europe, the Longwave Radio Mast at Hellissandur. 

In June 2008, the people of Snaefellsnes reached certification status as an EarthCheck community, becoming the first EarthCheck-certified area in Iceland and in Europe, and only the fourth in the world. Snaefellsnes has been committed to the EarthCheck programme since 2003 and has been successfully benchmarked for the past five consecutive years.

See also

Geography of Iceland
Volcanism of Iceland
EarthCheck

References

External links

 Information on the national park 
  Photo of mountain Kirkjufell near Grundarfjörður
 Official website, Westiceland
Snæfellsnes Peninsula

 
Peninsulas of Iceland